The 1928 Wesley Wildcats football team represented Wesley Collegiate Institute (later known as Wesley College) in the 1928 college football season as an independent. Led by coach Josh S. Faulkner his third and final year, the Wildcats compiled a 3–4 record. Bill Melson was team captain. Between October 26 and 27, Wesley scheduled four games, but had to cancel three due to date conflicts.

Schedule

References

Wesley
Wesley Wolverines football seasons
Wesley Wildcats football